Giurtelecu or Giurtelec may refer to:

 Giurtelecu Şimleului, a village in Măeriște commune
 Giurtelecu Hododului, a village in Hodod commune

See also
 Győrtelek, a village in Hungary